Monday Songs is the second album by American Rock band Nine Days. It was released in 1996, before their major-label debut album The Madding Crowd. It contained 11 tracks and it was released on the label Dirty Poet Records.

It is available for digital purchase from legal online music sources, such as Rhapsody Online Music Service and iTunes.

Track list
All songs written by John Hampson and Brian Desveaux, except "Where You Going Now?" by John Hampson and Matt Searing
 This Music – 4:35
 Where You Going Now? – 4:48
 Long Hard Road – 5:17
 I'd Go Crazy – 4:40
 Oklahoma City – 4:23
 The End of Agent Bobby Roe – 5:03
 Behind an Old Blue Vase – 4:41
 My Brother – 2:36
 Waiting On the Corner – 3:55
 See You In a Crowd – 4:24
 Road You Go Down – 4:01

Notes
 I'd Go Crazy was later rerecorded on their major label debut album The Madding Crowd with the shortened title Crazy.

Personnel
Adapted via Discogs.

Nine Days
 John Hampson – vocals, guitar
 Brian Desveaux – guitar, vocals, harmonica, mandolin
 Nick Dimichino – bass
 Jeremy Dean - piano, keyboards, organ, saxophone 
 Vincent Tattanelli  - drums

Additional Personnel
Annette Perry - cello (track 5)
Paul Paoli - fiddle (track 11)

Production
 Nine Days, Paul Umbach - Producer
 Paul Umbach - Engineer 
 Dave Goldberg - Edited By 
 Leon Zervos - Mastering

References

1996 albums
Nine Days albums